This was the first edition of the event.

Bobby Reynolds and John-Patrick Smith won the title, defeating Steve Johnson and Tim Smyczek in the final, 6–4, 7–6(7–2).

Seeds

Draw

Draw

References
 Main Draw

Napa Valley Challenger - Men's Doubles
2013 Men's Doubles